NHL repeat-containing protein 1 is a protein that in humans is encoded by the NHLRC1 gene.

See also
 NHL repeat

References

Further reading

External links
  GeneReviews/NCBI/NIH/UW entry on Progressive Myoclonus Epilepsy, Lafora Type